Nicky McFadden (6 December 1962 – 25 March 2014) was an Irish Fine Gael politician. She was elected as a Teachta Dála (TD) for Longford–Westmeath at the 2011 general election, and was a member of Seanad Éireann on the Administrative Panel from 2007 to 2011.

A community worker, she was chairperson of the Strategic Policy Committee (Planning) of Westmeath County Council and Westmeath County Heritage Forum, and a member of Westmeath VEC. She was also a member of the governing body of Athlone Institute of Technology and chairperson of the Board of Management of Athlone Community College.

She obtained a Legal Studies Diploma from Athlone IT, was a medical secretary for nine years, and was also a former employee of Electric Ireland.

She was first elected to Athlone Town Council in 1999, topping the poll. In July 2003 she was co-opted onto Westmeath County Council when her father, Brendan McFadden, retired.

McFadden unsuccessfully contested the 2007 general election in the Longford–Westmeath constituency where she received over 5,000 first preferences. She was elected to the Seanad in July 2007.

She died of the effects of motor neurone disease on 25 March 2014.

Her sister Gabrielle McFadden held the Fine Gael seat at the 2014 Longford–Westmeath by-election.

References

 

1962 births
2014 deaths
Alumni of Athlone Institute of Technology
Deaths from motor neuron disease
Neurological disease deaths in the Republic of Ireland
Fine Gael TDs
Local councillors in County Westmeath
Members of the 23rd Seanad
21st-century women members of Seanad Éireann
Members of the 31st Dáil
21st-century women Teachtaí Dála
People from Athlone
Politicians from County Westmeath
Fine Gael senators